An Evening of Acoustic Music is a live album by American blues artist Taj Mahal.  It was recorded October 6, 1993, in Bremen, Germany at Modernes.

Track listing

References

1996 live albums
Taj Mahal (musician) live albums